Carl Lee Perkins (April 9, 1932 – January 19, 1998) was an American guitarist, singer and songwriter.  A rockabilly great and pioneer of rock and roll, he began his recording career at the Sun Studio, in Memphis, beginning in 1954. Among his best-known songs are "Blue Suede Shoes", "Honey Don't", "Matchbox" and "Everybody's Trying to Be My Baby".

According to fellow musician Charlie Daniels, "Carl Perkins' songs personified the rockabilly era, and Carl Perkins' sound personifies the rockabilly sound more so than anybody involved in it, because he never changed." Perkins's songs were recorded by artists (and friends) as influential as Elvis Presley, the Beatles, Jimi Hendrix, Johnny Cash and Eric Clapton, which further established his prominent place in the history of popular music. Paul McCartney said "if there were no Carl Perkins, there would be no Beatles."

Nicknamed the "King of Rockabilly", Perkins was inducted into the Rock and Roll Hall of Fame, the Rockabilly Hall of Fame, the Memphis Music Hall of Fame, and the Nashville Songwriters Hall of Fame. He also received a Grammy Hall of Fame Award.

Biography

Early life
Carl Lee Perkins was born on April 9, 1932 in Tiptonville, Tennessee, the son of poor sharecroppers Louise and Buck Perkins (misspelled on his birth certificate as "Perkings"). Beginning at the age of six, he worked long hours in the cotton fields with his family, whether school was in session or not. Siblings included brothers Jay and Clayton. The boys grew up hearing Southern gospel music sung by white friends in church and by black field workers and sharecroppers in the cotton fields. On Saturday nights Perkins would listen to the Grand Ole Opry, broadcast from Nashville on his father's radio. 

Roy Acuff's broadcasts from the Opry inspired Perkins to ask his parents for a guitar. Since they could not afford to buy one, his father made one from a cigar box and a broomstick. Eventually, a neighbor sold his father a worn-out Gene Autry guitar. Perkins could not afford new strings, and when they broke, he had to retie them. The knots cut his fingers when he would slide to another note, so he began bending the notes, stumbling onto a type of blue note.

Perkins taught himself parts of Acuff's "Great Speckled Bird" and "The Wabash Cannonball", having heard them played on the Opry. He also has cited Bill Monroe's fast playing and vocals as an early influence. Perkins also learned from John Westbrook, an African-American field worker in his sixties who played blues and gospel music on an old acoustic guitar. Westbrook advised Perkins to "Get down close to it. You can feel it travel down the strangs, come through your head and down to your soul where you live. You can feel it. Let it vib-a-rate."

In January 1947, the Perkins family moved from Lake County, Tennessee, to Madison County, 70 miles from Memphis, the largest city in West Tennessee and a center of a great variety of music played by both black and white artists. At age fourteen Perkins wrote a country song called "Let Me Take You to the Movie, Magg". Sam Phillips was persuaded by the quality of that song to sign Perkins to his Sun Records label.

Beginnings as a performer
Perkins and his brother Jay had their first paying job (in tips) as entertainers during late 1946 at the Cotton Boll tavern on Highway 45, twelve miles south of Jackson, Tennessee, starting on Wednesday nights. Perkins was 14 years old. One of the songs they played was an up-tempo country blues shuffle version of Bill Monroe's "Blue Moon of Kentucky". Free drinks were one of the perks of playing in a tavern, and Perkins drank four beers that first night. Within a month Carl and Jay began playing Friday and Saturday nights at the Sand Ditch tavern, near the western boundary of Jackson. Both places were the scene of occasional fights, and both of the Perkins brothers gained a reputation as fighters.

During the next couple of years, as they became better known, the Perkins brothers began playing other taverns around Bemis and Jackson, including El Rancho, the Roadside Inn, and the Hilltop. Carl persuaded his brother Clayton to join them and play the upright bass, to complete the sound of the band.

Perkins began performing regularly on WTJS in Jackson during the late 1940s as a sometime member of the Tennessee Ramblers. He appeared on the radio programHayloft Frolic, on which he performed two songs. Sometimes one was "Talking Blues", as done by Robert Lunn on the Grand Ole Opry. Perkins and his brothers began appearing on The Early Morning Farm and Home Hour. Positive listener response resulted in a 15-minute segment sponsored by Mother's Best Flour. By the end of the 1940s, the Perkins Brothers were the best-known band in the Jackson area. Perkins had day jobs during most of these early years, including picking cotton, working at various factories and plants, and as a pan greaser for the Colonial Baking Company. His brothers had similar pick-up jobs.

In January 1953, Perkins married Valda Crider, whom he had known for a number of years. When his job at the bakery was reduced to part-time, Valda, who had her own job, encouraged Perkins to begin working the taverns full-time. He began playing six nights a week. Later the same year he added W.S. "Fluke" Holland to the band as a drummer. Holland had no previous experience as a musician but had a good sense of rhythm.

Malcolm Yelvington, who remembered the Perkins Brothers when they played in Covington, Tennessee, in 1953, noted that Carl had an unusual blues-like style all his own. By 1955 Perkins had made tapes of his material with a borrowed tape recorder, and he sent them to companies such as Columbia and RCA. But he used addresses such as "Columbia Records, New York City" and seemed dismayed at the lack of response. "I had sent tapes to RCA and Columbia and had never heard a thing from 'em."

In July 1954, Perkins and his wife heard a new release of "Blue Moon of Kentucky" by Elvis Presley, Scotty Moore and Bill Black on the radio. As the song faded out, Perkins said, "There's a man in Memphis who understands what we're doing. I need to go see him." According to another telling of the story, it was Valda who said that he should go to Memphis. Later, Presley told Perkins he had traveled to Jackson and had seen Perkins and his group playing at El Rancho.

Years later, the musician Gene Vincent told an interviewer that, rather than Elvis's version of "Blue Moon of Kentucky" being a "new sound", "a lot of people were doing it before that, especially Carl Perkins."

Sun Records 

Perkins successfully auditioned for Sam Phillips at Sun Records in early October 1954. "Movie Magg" and "Turn Around" were released on the Phillips-owned Flip label (151) on March 19, 1955. "Turn Around" became a regional success, and Perkins was booked to appear along with Elvis Presley at theaters in Marianna and West Memphis, Arkansas. Johnny Cash and the Tennessee Two were the next musicians to be added to the performances by Sun musicians. During the summer of 1955 they had junkets to Little Rock and Forrest City, Arkansas and to Corinth and Tupelo, Mississippi. Again performing at El Rancho, the Perkins brothers were involved in an automobile accident in Woodside, Delaware. A friend, who had been driving, was pinned by the steering wheel and had to be dragged from the burning car by Perkins. Clayton had been thrown from the car but was not seriously injured.

Another Perkins song, "Gone Gone Gone", released by Sun in October 1955, was also a regional success. It was a "bounce blues in flavorsome combined country and r.&b. idioms". The A-side, was the more traditional country song "Let the Jukebox Keep On Playing".

Commenting on Perkins's playing, Sam Phillips has been quoted as saying

I knew that Carl could rock and in fact he told me right from the start that he had been playing that music before Elvis came out on record ... I wanted to see whether this was someone who could revolutionize the country end of the business.

Also in the autumn of 1955, Perkins wrote "Blue Suede Shoes", inspired by seeing a dancer get angry with his date for scuffing up his shoes. Several weeks later, on December 19, 1955, Perkins and his band recorded the song during a session at Sun Studio in Memphis. Phillips suggested changes to the lyrics ("Go, cat, go"), and the band changed the end of the song to a "boogie vamp". 

After Sun records headliner Presley left for RCA in November 1955, Phillips told Perkins, "You're my rockabilly cat now." "Blue Suede Shoes" was released on January 1, 1956, and became a massive chart success. In the United States, it reached number 1 on Billboard magazine's country music chart (the only number 1 success he would have) and number 2 on the Billboard Best Sellers popular music chart. On February 11 Presley performed it on CBS-TV's Stage Show.  On March 17 Perkins became the first country artist to reach number 3 on the rhythm and blues charts. That night, he performed the song on ABC-TV's Ozark Jubilee, and Presley reprised his performance on Stage Show.

In the United Kingdom, Perkins's song reached number 10 on the British charts. It was the first record by a Sun artist to sell a million copies. The B side, "Honey Don't", was later covered by the Beatles, Wanda Jackson and, in the 1970s, T. Rex. John Lennon originally sang the song when the Beatles performed it; later it was given to Ringo Starr, one of his few leads during his time with the band. Lennon also performed the song on the Lost Lennon Tapes.

Road crash
After playing a show in Norfolk, Virginia, on March 21, 1956, the Perkins Brothers Band headed to New York City for a March 24 appearance on NBC-TV's Perry Como Show. Shortly before sunrise on March 22, on Route 13 between Dover and Woodside, Delaware, their vehicle hit the back of a pickup truck and went into a ditch containing about 12 inches of water. Holland had to pull Perkins, unconscious, from the water. Perkins had sustained three fractured vertebrae in his neck, a severe concussion, a broken collar bone, and lacerations all over his body. Perkins remained unconscious for an entire day. The driver of the pickup truck, Thomas Phillips, a 40-year-old farmer, died when he was thrown into the steering wheel. Jay Perkins had a fractured neck and severe internal injuries. Later he developed a malignant brain tumor, and died in 1958.

On March 23, Presley's band members Bill Black, Scotty Moore and D.J. Fontana visited Perkins on their way to New York to appear with Elvis. Fontana recalled Perkins saying, "You looked like a bunch of angels coming to see me." Black told him, "Hey man, Elvis sends his love", and lit a cigarette for him, even though the patient in the next bed was in an oxygen tent. Presley also telegraphed Perkins his well wishes.

"Blue Suede Shoes" had sold more than 500,000 copies by March 22, and Sam Philips had planned to celebrate by presenting Perkins with a gold record on The Perry Como Show. While Perkins recuperated from his injuries, "Blue Suede Shoes" reached number 1 on regional pop, R&B, and country charts. It also reached number 2 on the Billboard pop and country charts, below Elvis Presley's "Heartbreak Hotel". By mid-April, more than one million copies of "Blue Suede Shoes" had been sold. On April 3, while still recuperating in Jackson, Perkins watched Presley perform "Blue Suede Shoes" in his first appearance on The Milton Berle Show. This was the third time he performed the song on national television.

Return to recording and touring

Perkins returned to live performances on April 21, 1956, beginning with an appearance in Beaumont, Texas, with the "Big D Jamboree" tour. Before he resumed touring, Sam Phillips arranged a recording session at Sun, with Ed Cisco filling in for the still-recuperating Jay. By mid-April, "Dixie Fried", "Put Your Cat Clothes On", "Wrong Yo-Yo", "You Can't Make Love to Somebody", "Everybody's Trying to Be My Baby", and "That Don't Move Me" had been recorded. On May 26, Perkins and his band (with Jay Perkins performing wearing a visible neck brace), finally appeared on The Perry Como Show to perform "Blue Suede Shoes".

Beginning early that summer, Perkins was paid $1,000 to play two songs a night on the extended tour of "Top Stars of '56". Other performers on the tour were Chuck Berry and Frankie Lymon and the Teenagers. When Perkins and the group entered the stage in Columbia, South Carolina, he was shocked to see a teenager with a bleeding chin pressed against the stage by the massed crowd. During the first guitar intermission of "Honey Don't", they were waved offstage and into a vacant dressing room behind a double line of police officers. Appalled by what he had seen and felt, Perkins left the tour. Appearing with Gene Vincent and Lillian Briggs in a "rock 'n' roll show", he helped attract 39,872 people to the Reading Fair in Pennsylvania on a Tuesday night in late September. Soon after, a full grandstand and one thousand people stood in a heavy rain to hear Perkins and Briggs at the Brockton Fair in Massachusetts.

Sun issued more Perkins songs in 1956: "Boppin' the Blues"/"All Mama's Children" (Sun 243), the B side co-written with Johnny Cash; and "Dixie Fried"/"I'm Sorry, I'm Not Sorry" (Sun 249). "Matchbox"/"Your True Love" (Sun 261) came out in February 1957. "Boppin' the Blues" reached number 47 on the Cashbox pop singles chart, number 9 on the Billboard country and western chart, and number 70 on the Billboard Top 100 chart.

"Matchbox" is considered a rockabilly classic. It was recorded with Perkins on lead guitar and vocals, and then Sun studio piano player Jerry Lee Lewis.  Later that day there was an impromptu session with Perkins, Presley, Johnny Cash, and Jerry Lee Lewis, informally referred to as the Million Dollar Quartet. The full recordings from this jam session, a selection of gospel, country, and R&B songs, were released in 1990.

On February 2, 1957, Perkins again appeared on Ozark Jubilee, singing "Matchbox" and "Blue Suede Shoes". He also made at least two appearances on Town Hall Party in Compton, California, in 1957, singing both songs. Those performances were included in the Western Ranch Dance Party series filmed and distributed by Screen Gems.

He released "That's Right", co-written with Johnny Cash, backed with the ballad "Forever Yours", as Sun single 274 in August 1957. Neither side made it onto the charts.

The 1957 film Jamboree included a Perkins performance of "Glad All Over". The song, written by Aaron Schroeder, Sid Tepper, and Roy C. Bennett, was released by Sun in January 1958.

Life after Sun
In 1958, Perkins moved to Columbia Records, for which he recorded "Jive After Five", "Rockin' Record Hop", "Levi Jacket (And a Long Tail Shirt)", "Pop, Let Me Have the Car", "Pink Pedal Pushers", "Any Way the Wind Blows", "Hambone", "Pointed Toe Shoes", "Sister Twister", "L-O-V-E-V-I-L-L-E" and other songs.

In 1959, he wrote the country & western song "The Ballad of Boot Hill" for Johnny Cash, who recorded it on an EP for Columbia Records. In the same year, Perkins was cast in a Filipino movie produced by People's Pictures, Hawaiian Boy, in which he sang "Blue Suede Shoes".

He performed often at the Golden Nugget Casino in Las Vegas in 1962 and 1963. During this time he toured nine Midwestern states and made a tour in Germany. In 1962 Patsy Cline recorded "So Wrong" written by Carl, Mel Tillis and Danny Dill and had a #14 hit on the Country charts.

In May 1964, Perkins toured Britain with Chuck Berry. Perkins had been reluctant to undertake the tour, convinced that as forgotten as he had become in America, he would be even more obscure in the U.K., and did not want to be humiliated by drawing meager audiences. Berry assured him that they had remained much more popular in Britain since the 1950s than they had in the United States, and that there would be large crowds of fans at every show. The popular young rock group The Animals backed the two performers. On the last night of the tour, Perkins attended a party where he sat on the floor sharing stories, playing guitar, and singing songs while surrounded by the Beatles. Ringo Starr asked if he could record "Honey Don't". Perkins answered, "Man, go ahead, have at it." The Beatles later recorded covers of "Matchbox", "Honey Don't" and "Everybody's Trying to Be My Baby" (recorded by Perkins, adapted from a song originally recorded by Rex Griffin in 1936, with new music by Perkins; a song with the same title was recorded by Roy Newman in 1938). Ringo sang the lead on the first two, George Harrison received a rare lead on the third. The Beatles also recorded two versions of "Glad All Over" in 1963. Another tour to Germany followed in the autumn.

He released "Big Bad Blues" backed with "Lonely Heart" as a single on Brunswick Records with the Nashville Teens in June 1964.

In 1966, Perkins signed with Dollie Records and released as his first single "Country Boy's Dream", which reached #22 in the country charts. That same year Bob Luman had a Top 40 Country hit with Carl's song "Poor Boy Blues".

While on tour with the Johnny Cash troupe in 1968, Perkins went on a four-day drinking binge that ended in him hallucinating floridly and passing out. When he regained consciousness, he went out to the beach with his last bottle of alcohol. In his autobiography, he described falling to his knees and declaring, "Lord, ... I'm gonna throw this bottle. I'm gonna show You that I believe in you," before hurling the bottle into the sea and vowing to remain sober. Perkins and Cash, who had his own substance-abuse issues, supported each other in their bid to remain sober.

In 1968, Cash recorded the Perkins-written "Daddy Sang Bass" (which incorporates parts of the American standard "Will the Circle Be Unbroken"), and scored No. 1 on the country music charts for six weeks. "Daddy Sang Bass" was a Country Music Association nominee for Song of the Year. Perkins also played lead guitar on Cash's single "A Boy Named Sue", recorded live at San Quentin prison, which went to No. 1 for five weeks on the country chart and No. 2 on the pop chart (the performance was also filmed by Granada Television for broadcast). 

Perkins spent a decade in Cash's touring revue, often as an opening act for Cash (as at the Folsom and San Quentin prison concerts, at which he was recorded singing "Blue Suede Shoes" and "Matchbox" before Cash took the stage; these performances were not released until the 2000s). He also appeared on the television series The Johnny Cash Show. On the television program Kraft Music Hall on April 16, 1969, hosted by Cash, Perkins performed his song "Restless".

Perkins and Bob Dylan wrote "Champaign, Illinois" in 1969. Dylan had recorded his album Nashville Skyline, a bold crossover into country, in Nashville from February 12 to February 21. He met Perkins when he appeared on The Johnny Cash Show on June 7. Dylan had writer's block and was unable to complete the song until Perkins contributed a rhythm and some lyrics, upon which Dylan said to him, "Your song. Take it. Finish it." Perkins registered the song as co-authored and recorded it on his 1969 album On Top.

Also in 1969, Columbia's Murray Krugman placed Perkins with the New Rhythm and Blues Quartet, a rockabilly group based in New York's Hudson Valley. Perkins and NRBQ recorded Boppin' the Blues, which featured the group backing him on songs including his staples "Turn Around" and "Boppin' the Blues", as well as songs recorded separately by Perkins and NRBQ. Perkins appeared with Cash on TV on the popular country series Hee Haw, on February 16, 1974.

Tommy Cash (brother of Johnny Cash) had a Top Ten country gospel hit in 1970, with a recording of the song "Rise and Shine", written by Perkins. It reached number 9 on the Billboard country chart and number 8 on the Canadian country chart. Arlene Harden had a Top 40 country hit in 1971 with the Perkins composition "True Love Is Greater Than Friendship", from the film Little Fauss and Big Halsy (1971). Al Martino's cover of the song that same year reached number 22 on the Billboard country chart and number 33 on the Billboard Adult Contemporary chart.

After a long legal struggle with Sam Phillips over royalties, Perkins gained ownership of his songs in the 1970s.

Later years
The rockabilly revival of the 1980s helped bring Perkins back into the limelight. In 1981 Perkins recorded the song "Get It" with Paul McCartney, providing vocals and playing guitar with the former Beatle; according to one source, he fully co-wrote the song with McCartney. This recording was included on the chart-topping album Tug of War, released in 1982.  During 1985, Perkins re-recorded "Blue Suede Shoes" with Lee Rocker and Slim Jim Phantom of the Stray Cats, as part of the soundtrack for the film Porky's Revenge.

In October 1985, Perkins was joined on stage in London for a television special, Blue Suede Shoes: A Rockabilly Session, by George Harrison, Eric Clapton, Dave Edmunds, Lee Rocker, Rosanne Cash and Ringo Starr. The show was taped live at the Limehouse Studios. It was broadcast on Channel 4 on January 1, 1986. Perkins performed 16 songs, with two encores, in an extraordinary performance. He and his friends ended the session by singing "Blue Suede Shoes", his most famous song, 30 years after its writing, which brought Perkins to tears. The concert special was a highlight of his later career. It has been praised by fans for the spirited performances delivered by Perkins and his guests. The concert was released for DVD by Snapper Music in 2006.

Perkins was inducted into the Nashville Songwriters Hall of Fame in 1985. Wider recognition of his contribution to music came with his induction into the Rock and Roll Hall of Fame in 1987. "Blue Suede Shoes" was chosen as one of the Rock and Roll Hall of Fame's “500 Songs That Shaped Rock and Roll”. The song also received a Grammy Hall of Fame Award. Perkins was inducted into the Rockabilly Hall of Fame in recognition of his pioneering contribution to the genre.

Perkins's only notable film performance as an actor was in John Landis's 1985 film Into the Night. The cameo-laden film includes a scene in which characters played by Perkins and David Bowie die by each other's hand.

Perkins returned to the Sun Studio in Memphis in 1986, joining Cash, Jerry Lee Lewis, and Roy Orbison on the album Class of '55. The record was a tribute to their early years at Sun and, specifically, the Million Dollar Quartet jam session involving Perkins, Presley, Cash, and Lewis in 1956.

In 1989, Perkins co-wrote and played guitar on the Judds' number 1 country hit, "Let Me Tell You About Love". Also in that year, he signed a record deal with Platinum Records for the album Friends, Family, and Legends, featuring performances by Chet Atkins, Travis Tritt, Steve Wariner, Joan Jett and Charlie Daniels, along with Paul Shaffer and Will Lee. The song "Wild Texas Wind" became the title track to a made-for-TV movie featuring Dolly Parton and Gary Busey. In 1996 Willie Nelson, who also appeared in that movie, would join Carl in a duett version of the song. During the production of this album, Perkins was diagnosed with throat cancer. 
Dolly Parton had a Top 20 Country hit in 1991 with the Perkins co-written "Silver and Gold".

Mark O'Connor recorded a version of the Perkins classic "Restless" in 1991 and had a #25 Country hit with it in the US (#19 in Canada).

He again returned to Sun Studio to record with Scotty Moore, Presley's first guitar player, for the album 706 ReUNION, released by Belle Meade Records, which also featured D. J. Fontana, Marcus Van Storey and the Jordanaires. In 1993, Perkins performed with the Kentucky Headhunters in a music video remake of his song "Dixie Fried", filmed in Glasgow, Kentucky. In 1994, he teamed up with Duane Eddy and the Mavericks to contribute "Matchbox" to the AIDS benefit album Red Hot + Country, produced by the Red Hot Organization.

His last album, Go Cat Go!, released by the independent label Dinosaur Records in 1996, features Perkins singing duets with Bono, Johnny Cash, John Fogerty, George Harrison, Paul McCartney, Willie Nelson, Tom Petty, Paul Simon, and Ringo Starr.

His last major concert performance was the Music for Montserrat all-star charity concert at London's Royal Albert Hall on September 15, 1997, four months before his death.

Personal life
A strong advocate for the prevention of child abuse, Perkins worked with the Jackson Exchange Club to establish the first center for the prevention of child abuse in Tennessee and the fourth in the nation. Proceeds from a concert planned by Perkins were combined with a grant from the National Exchange Club to establish the Prevention of Child Abuse in October 1981. For years its annual Circle of Hope Telethon generated one quarter of the center's annual operating budget.

Perkins had one daughter, Debbie, and three sons, Stan, Greg, and Steve.

Stan, his first-born son, is also a recording artist. In 2010, he joined forces with Jerry Naylor to record a duet tribute, "To Carl: Let It Vibrate". Stan has been inducted into the Rockabilly Hall of Fame.

Perkins died on January 19, 1998, at the age of 65 at Jackson-Madison County Hospital in Jackson, Tennessee, from complications from several minor strokes the previous month. Among the mourners at his funeral at Lambuth University were George Harrison, Jerry Lee Lewis, Wynonna Judd, Sam Phillips, Brian Setzer, Garth Brooks, Nashville agent Jim Dallas Crouch, Dallas rock and roll memorabilia executive Jacques Vroom, Jr., Johnny Cash and June Carter Cash. Perkins was interred at Ridgecrest Cemetery in Jackson.

Perkins' widow, Valda deVere Perkins, died on November 15, 2005, in Jackson.

Guitar style
As a guitarist Perkins used finger picking, imitations of the pedal steel guitar, palm muting, arpeggios, advantageous use of open strings, single and double string bending, chromaticism, country and blues licks, and tritone and other tonality clashing licks (short phrases that include notes from other keys and move in logical, often symmetric patterns). A rich vocabulary of chords including sixth and thirteenth chords, ninth and add nine chords, and suspensions, show up in rhythm parts and solos. Free use of syncopations, chord anticipations (arriving at a chord change before the other players, often by an eighth-note) and crosspicking (repeating a three eighth-note pattern so that an accent falls variously on the upbeat or downbeat) were also in his bag of tricks.

Legacy
 
Perkins wrote his autobiography, Go, Cat, Go, published in 1996, in collaboration with music writer David McGee in 1996. Plans for a biographical film were announced by Santa Monica-based production company Fastlane Entertainment. was slated for release in 2009.

In 2004, Rolling Stone ranked Perkins number 99 on its list of the 100 Greatest Artists of All Time.

Many of the Beatles' live shows were full of Rock 'N' Roll covers of Carl Perkins’s songs such as 'Everybody's Trying To Be My Baby', 'Matchbox' and 'Honey Don't'.

His version of "Blue Suede Shoes" was included by the National Recording Preservation Board in the National Recording Registry of the Library of Congress in 2006.

The Perkins family still owns his songs.

Drive-By Truckers, on their album The Dirty South, recorded a song about him, "Carl Perkins' Cadillac".
The Carl Perkins Arena in Jackson, Tennessee, is named in his honor.

George Thorogood and the Destroyers covered "Dixie Fried" on their 1985 album Maverick. The Kentucky Headhunters also covered the song, as did Keith de Groot on his 1968 album No Introduction Necessary, with Jimmy Page on lead guitar and John Paul Jones on bass.

Ricky Nelson covered Perkins's "Boppin' the Blues" and "Your True Love" on his 1957 debut album, Ricky.

Perkins was portrayed by Johnny "Kid Memphis" Holiday in the 2005 Johnny Cash biopic Walk the Line.

Perkins was honored with the "Lifetime Achievement" award during the Tennessee Music Awards event in 2018 at the University of Memphis Lambuth in Jackson, Tennessee.

Awards

The following recording by Carl Perkins was inducted into the Grammy Hall of Fame, which is a special Grammy award established in 1973 to honor recordings that are at least 25 years old and that have "qualitative or historical significance".

Discography

Studio albums
 Dance Album (1957)
 Whole Lotta Shakin''' (1958)
 Country Boy's Dream (1967)
 On Top (Columbia, 1969)
 My Kind of Country (Mercury, 1973)
 Ol' Blue Suede's Back (1978)
 Country Soul (1979)
 Disciple in Blue Suede Shoes (1984)
 Born to Rock (1989)
 Friends, Family & Legends (1992)

Collaborative albums
 Boppin' the Blues (1970, with NRBQ)
 The Million Dollar Quartet (1981, with Elvis Presley, Jerry Lee Lewis, and Johnny Cash)
 The Survivors (1982, with Jerry Lee Lewis and Johnny Cash)
 Class of '55 (1986, with Roy Orbison, Jerry Lee Lewis, and Johnny Cash)
 706 Re-Union (1990, with Scotty Moore)
 Carl Perkins & Sons (1993, with his sons Greg and Stan)
 Go Cat Go! (1996, with various guest stars)

Live albums
 The Carl Perkins Show (1976)
 Live at Austin City Limits (1981)
 The Silver Eagle Cross Country: Carl Perkins Live (1997)
 Live at Gilley's (1999)
 Live (2000)
 Blue Suede Shoes: A Rockabilly Session (2006)

Religious albums
 Rock 'N Gospel (1979)
 Cane Creek Glory Church (1979)
 Gospel (1984)

Selected compilations
 Carl Perkins' Greatest Hits (1969, re-recordings)
 Original Golden Hits (1969)
 Mr. Country Rock (Demand, 1977)
 That Rockin' Guitar Man (1981)
 Presenting Carl Perkins (Accord, 1982)
 Every Road (Joker, 1982)
 Goin' Back to Memphis (Joker, 1982)
 Boppin' the New Bleus (1982)
 Born to Boogie (O'Hara Records, 1982)
 This Ole House (1982)
 Presenting (1982)
 The Heart and Soul of Carl Perkins (Allegiance, 1983)
 Carl Perkins (Dot, 1985)
 Original Sun Greatest Hits (1986)
 Up Through the Years 1954–57 (1986)
 Country Boy's Dream - The Dollie Masters (Bear Family, 1991)
 Take Me Back (1993)Back on Top - (Bear Family, 2000; 4 CDs, comprising 1968–1975)

Guest appearances
 Judds: Greatest Hits Volume II (1991)
 Philip Claypool: Perfect World (1999)

Charted albums

Charted singles

Billboard Year-end performances

 Citations 

 General and cited references 
 Guterman, Jimmy (1998). "Carl Perkins". The Encyclopedia of Country Music''. Paul Kingsbury, ed. New York: Oxford University Press. pp. 412–413.

External links

 
 Carl Perkins biography
 Perkins's page at the Rockabilly Hall of Fame
 Carl Perkins bio at Rolling Stone
 Carl Perkins Biography at The History of Rock

1932 births
1998 deaths
20th-century American guitarists
20th-century American male singers
20th-century American singers
American country guitarists
American country singer-songwriters
American male guitarists
American male singer-songwriters
American rock guitarists
American rockabilly guitarists
American rockabilly musicians
Charly Records artists
Columbia Records artists
Country musicians from Tennessee
Deaths from cancer in Tennessee
Deaths from esophageal cancer
Grammy Award winners
Guitarists from Tennessee
Lead guitarists
London Records artists
Mercury Records artists
People from Jackson, Tennessee
People from Tiptonville, Tennessee
Rock and roll musicians
Singer-songwriters from Tennessee
Sun Records artists
The Tennessee Three members